is a passenger railway station located in the city of Sanuki, Kagawa Prefecture, Japan. It is operated by JR Shikoku and has the station number "T18".

Lines
Orange Town Station is served by the JR Shikoku Kōtoku Line and is located 18.9 km from the beginning of the line at Takamatsu.

Layout
The station consists of an island platform serving two tracks. The station building of modernistic concrete design is unstaffed and serves only as a waiting room. Access to the island platform from the station building is by means of a footbridge which also gives access to the other of the tracks.

History
Orange Town Station was opened on 14 March 1998 as an added station on the existing Kōtoku Line by JRShikoku.

Surrounding area
Orange Town Housing Area

See also
List of railway stations in Japan

References

External links

Station Timetable

Railway stations in Kagawa Prefecture
Railway stations in Japan opened in 1998
Sanuki, Kagawa